The Aircraft Act, 1934 is an Act of Parliament in India.

Provisions
The Aircraft Act governs aviation in India.

References

Acts of the Parliament of India
Aviation in India